Samantha Siddall (born 23 January 1982) is an English actress, best known for playing Mandy Maguire in Channel 4 comedy drama series Shameless. Aside from playing Mandy Maguire in Shameless Siddall has previously appeared in Holby City, Bodies, Doctors, Cutting It and Jane Eyre.

Filmography

Television
Shameless as Mandy Maguire (2004–2009, 2011)

References

External links

1982 births
Living people
English television actresses
Actresses from Manchester
Actors from Stockport
People from Reddish